Darkness is a 2019 Italian feature film directed by Emanuela Rossi and starring Denise Tantucci and Valerio Binasco.

Cast 
 Denise Tantucci as Stella
 Valerio Binasco as father
 Gaia Bocci as Luce
 Olimpia Tosatto as Aria
 Elettra Mallaby as mother
 Francesco Genovese as Marco

Release 
The film was released on May 7, 2020 on the platform Mymovies.it.

Reception 
Darkness received the Nastro d'Argento for Best Screenplay in 2020, and Rossi received a nomination for Best Original Story.

References

External links

Italian mystery drama films
2019 films
2010s Italian-language films
2010s Italian films